Randy Bell is an American musician who was signed to Epic Records. He released the single "Don't Do Me" which made it to number 90 on the Billboard Hot 100.

References

External links
Randy Bell discography on Discogs

Musicians from Colorado
American male musicians

Possibly living people
Year of birth missing